The 1953 Japan Series was the Nippon Professional Baseball (NPB) championship series for the 1953 season. It was the fourth Japan Series and featured the Pacific League champions, the Nankai Hawks, against the Central League champions, the Yomiuri Giants.

Summary

Matchups

Game 1
Saturday, October 10, 1953 – 2:05 pm at Osaka Stadium in Osaka, Osaka Prefecture

Game 2
Sunday, October 11, 1953 – 2:05 pm at Osaka Stadium in Osaka, Osaka Prefecture

Game 3
Monday, October 12, 1953 – 1:35 pm at Korakuen Stadium in Bunkyō, Tokyo

Game 4
Tuesday, October 13, 1953 – 1:33 pm at Korakuen Stadium in Bunkyō, Tokyo

Game 5
Wednesday, October 14, 1953 – 2:02 pm at Osaka Stadium in Osaka, Osaka Prefecture

Game 6
Thursday, October 15, 1953 – 2:00 pm at Koshien Stadium in Nishinomiya, Hyōgo Prefecture

Game 7
Friday, October 16, 1953 – 1:30 pm at Korakuen Stadium in Bunkyō, Tokyo

See also
1953 World Series

References

Japan Series
Japan Series
Japan Series
Japan series